Hilton Als (born 1960) is an American writer and theater critic. He is a teaching professor at the University of California, Berkeley, an associate professor of writing at Columbia University and a staff writer and theater critic for The New Yorker magazine. He is a former staff writer for The Village Voice and former editor-at-large at Vibe magazine.

In June 2020, Als was named an inaugural Presidential Visiting Scholar at Princeton University for the 2020–2021 academic year.

Background and career
Hilton Als was born in New York City, with roots in Barbados. Hilton was raised in Brownsville, Brooklyn, he has four older sisters and one younger brother.

His 1996 book The Women focuses on his mother (who raised him in Brooklyn), Dorothy Dean, and Owen Dodson, who was a mentor and lover of Als.
In the book, Als explores his identification of the confluence of his ethnicity, gender and sexuality, moving from identifying as a "Negress" and then an "Auntie Man", a Barbadian term for homosexuals. His 2013 book White Girls continued to explore race, gender, identity in a series of essays about everything from the AIDS epidemic to Richard Pryor's life and work.

Als received a Guggenheim fellowship in 2000 for creative writing and the 2002–03 George Jean Nathan Award for Dramatic Criticism. In 2004 he won the Berlin Prize of the American Academy in Berlin, which provided him half a year of free working and studying in Berlin.
In addition to Columbia, he has taught at Smith College, Wellesley College, Wesleyan University, and Yale University, and his work has also appeared in The Nation, The Believer, and the New York Review of Books.

In 2017, he was awarded the Pulitzer Prize for Criticism: "For bold and original reviews that strove to put stage dramas within a real-world cultural context, particularly the shifting landscape of gender, sexuality and race."

As an art curator, Als has been responsible for exhibitions including the group show Forces in Nature (featuring work by such artists as Njideka Akunyili Crosby, Peter Doig, Chris Ofili, Celia Paul, Tal R, Sarah Sze, Kara Walker, and Francesca Woodman) in 2015, and most recently an exhibition of work from the Manhattan years of portraitist Alice Neel, entitled Alice Neel, Uptown, at David Zwirner Gallery in New York City and Victoria Miro Gallery in London (May 18 – July 29, 2017).

Awards and honors
2013 National Book Critics Circle Award (Criticism) shortlist for White Girls
2016 Windham–Campbell Literature Prize (Nonfiction)
2016 Pulitzer Prize (Criticism)
2018 Honorary Doctorate, The New School.
In June 2020, in honor of the 50th anniversary of the first LGBTQ Pride parade, Queerty named him among the fifty heroes “leading the nation toward equality, acceptance, and dignity for all people”.

Bibliography

See also

 LGBT culture in New York City
 List of LGBT writers
 List of LGBT people from New York City

References

External links

 Et Als (official site and blog)
 New Yorker page
 New York Review of Books archive

1960 births
20th-century American non-fiction writers
21st-century American non-fiction writers
African-American non-fiction writers
American people of Barbadian descent
American theater critics
Columbia University alumni
Columbia University faculty
Date of birth missing (living people)
LGBT African Americans
LGBT people from New York (state)
American LGBT writers
Living people
The New Yorker critics
The New Yorker staff writers
The New Yorker people
Smith College faculty
Lambda Literary Award winners
The Village Voice people
Writers from Brooklyn
People from Brownsville, Brooklyn
20th-century African-American writers
21st-century African-American writers
American male non-fiction writers